Truth of the World: Welcome to the Show is the third studio album by Evermore, released on 20 March 2009. The album is a concept album about trash media, political propaganda, advertising and infotainment.

Three singles have been released from the album – "Between the Lines", "Hey Boys and Girls (Truth of the World pt.2)" and "Can You Hear Me?". From 15 to 20 March 2009, the entire album was available to stream on the band's MySpace page.

Production
Truth of the World: Welcome to the Show was recorded at the band's own studio in Melbourne and took 18 months to complete. The album is described by Jon Hume as a concept album that "takes inspiration from trash entertainment, news headlines and political propaganda, and turns it into an over the top, fun, rock'n'roll show."

Describing the aim of the album, Jon said, "I heard someone say that albums were dead… and everyone just wants three-minute songs these days. That's exactly what we are trying to fight with this record. We hit reset on what this band was about, threw everything out and just imagined the record we would want to hear someone else make." "I think we just wanted to challenge ourselves and explore something new as a band. A concept album is something we've wanted to do for a really long time", said Jon.

Jon was initially working on songs about a young man who disappears but Dann had difficulty writing songs for the story and characters. "He just didn't get it. But then he came up with this idea of having news reports coming in between songs and as soon as he said that we went off on this tangent of TV shows, newspapers, ad breaks, and all this product people were trying to sell. It turned into this crazy, over-the-top idea that took on a life of its own", said Jon.

The album was influenced by Ray Bradbury's 1953 novel Fahrenheit 451 as well as visits to the United States and United Kingdom. The band watched American news channels and read trashy tabloid stories to get ideas. The album contains sound bites from John F. Kennedy ("Between the Lines"), Hitler ("Everybody's Doing It") and a line from the Charlie Chaplin movie The Great Dictator.

"Truth of the World" Australian tour 2009
The band toured Australia nationwide from May through to July 2009 in support of the new album with End of Fashion as special guests and up and coming Adelaide band The Sundance Kids as show openers. Evermore unveiled a new high-tech live setup backed by a wall of television screens featuring a barrage of images and news-ticker style lyrics. Jon Hume, Evermore's lead singer and guitarist stated in an interview about the live shows:

Track listing

Personnel
Jon Hume – vocals, guitars, synthesizers, percussion, programming, production, concept
Peter Hume – bass, keyboards, synthesizers, piano, vocals, vocoder, programming, percussion, artwork
Dann Hume – drums, vocals, guitars, piano, percussion, programming, production, concept, artwork

Charts

Release history

References

2009 albums
Evermore (band) albums